Kuusaankoski (meaning: Kuusaa rapids) is a popular fishing rapids in Central Finland with cultural heritage landscape. The Kuusaankoski rapids are among the best trout rapids in southern Finland.

Kuusaankoski is located on the waterway from lake Vatianjärvi into lake Saraavesi in Laukaa. The fishing season is from January 1 to September 10 and from November 16 to December 31. The natural catch species are grayling, brown trout, ide, pike and whitefish. Stocked species are freshwater salmon, whitefish, brown trout and grayling. Lake trout is the most wanted catch on the rapid Kuusaankoski. It is also able to breed in the river naturally. There are big anadromous lake trout from lake Päijänne in the river.

In Kuusankoski there is also a lock of the Keitele Canal, a bridge, scenic views, lodging, restaurants, and other services.

References

External links
 A YouTube video Kuusaankoski 2011 

Rivers of Finland
Landforms of Central Finland